The Boggabilla railway line is a disused railway line in New South Wales, Australia.

Construction

When the line was first approved, few could have envisaged the development of grain production after the 1940s in the area. It was mainly grazing country then. The Boggabilla line was authorised mainly to ensure that the output of graziers in the area went south through New South Wales ports rather than north, across the border to Queensland.

The line involved only light earthworks, but did include a number of watercourses to be crossed. By mid-1928, clearing had been completed to the  point and work steadily continued until 1930 when due to a shortage of funds, work closed down for six months.

Opening
The line was eventually opened throughout on 20 June 1932.

Traffic
Upon opening, the train service comprised a twice weekly mixed train running from Moree to Boggabilla on Mondays and Fridays, returning the following day. From 24 February 1936, a weekly CPH railmotor service was introduced. This was later increased to thrice weekly, Mondays, Wednesdays and Fridays. These railmotor services were day returns from Moree. Additionally, goods trains operated as well.

Bulk wheat storage at locations along the line first appeared in 1956 bringing additional traffic to the line. 48 class diesel locomotives first appeared in 1959, speeding up the movement of grain and other freight.

Passenger services came to an abrupt halt on 3 August 1974, when the railmotor service was cancelled in the name of a current fuel crisis. Goods services also diminished at this time, being replaced by road trucks working out of Moree.

By 1978, rail services were largely worked on a seasonal basis, hauling wheat, and an occasional train to Boggabilla to collect sleepers milled locally.

Demise
Since the 1970s, the lines radiating out of Moree have been basically on a seasonal basis only, serving the needs of the grain producers. The stationmaster at Boggabilla was withdrawn in 1979. In 1987, the line was truncated at North Star and grain was road trucked to the silos there and at Crooble. The last train to run to Boggabilla was on 23 November 1987. In November 2013, the remainder of the line was booked out of use. It is able to be reopened with 14 days notice, being reopened in full for three weeks from 28 July 2014.

Future
The line will be reused as part of the new Melbourne to Brisbane inland rail corridor.

References

Railway lines opened in 1932
Railway lines closed in 2013
Regional railway lines in New South Wales
Standard gauge railways in Australia
1932 establishments in Australia
2013 disestablishments in Australia